Brazilian Island (in Standard ; in Portuñol/Portunhol: Isla Brasilera) is a small uninhabited river island at the confluence of the Uruguay River and the Quaraí (Cuareim) River, between the borders of Argentina, Brazil and Uruguay, which is disputed by the two latter countries.

Overview 
The island has long been claimed by both Brazil and Uruguay. Brazilian officials claim that the island is within their municipality of Barra do Quaraí, state of Rio Grande do Sul. Uruguayan officials claim that the island is part of their municipality of Bella Unión, in Artigas Department. However, neither country has shown interest in actively enforcing its claims to the island, for example by sending troops there. Like the other territorial dispute between Brazil and Uruguay in the vicinity of Masoller, it has not prevented close and friendly diplomatic and economic ties between the two countries.

From 1964 to 2011, the island had a single house and a single inhabitant, a Brazilian farmer called José Jorge Daniel. In 2011, suffering from health problems, Mr. Daniel moved out of the island to live with relatives in the nearby city of Uruguaiana, Brazil, where he died shortly afterwards, aged 93 or 95 (sources differ). Since then, the island has been uninhabited and unoccupied.

On 7 August 2009, the island suffered severe damage by a fire caused by unknown reasons (though arson was suspected), which burned at least 40% of the island's area. The fire was eventually put out by a joint transnational effort by the firefighters from Barra do Quaraí and Bella Unión. Mr. Daniel, who still lived there at the time, and his house were unscathed. Since then, teams of biologists and students from nearby Brazilian universities, supported by Brazilian and Uruguayan ecological NGOs, have gone on occasional expeditions to the island to study the fire damage to local wildlife and try to restore its former ecosystem.

See also 
 Masoller - Uruguayan village located next to another disputed area on the Brazilian border.

Note 

References 

Argentina–Uruguay border
Border tripoints
Borders of Brazil
Borders of Uruguay
Brazil–Uruguay border
Disputed islands
Islands of the Uruguay River
River islands of Brazil
River islands of Uruguay
Territorial disputes of Brazil
Territorial disputes of Uruguay